This is the list of episodes (Seasons 21–40) for the Food Network competition reality series Chopped.

Series overview

Episodes

Season 21 (2014–15)

Season 22 (2014–15)

Season 23 (2014–15)

Season 24 (2015)

Season 25 (2015)

Season 26 (2015)

Season 27 (2016)
 Chopped regular Marc Murphy did not appear as a judge in any episode this season.

Season 28 (2016)

Season 29 (2016)

Season 30 (2016)

Season 31 (2016)
 This is the first season where more than 13 episodes aired.

Season 32 (2017)

Season 33 (2017)

Season 34 (2017)

Season 35 (2017–18)

Season 36 (2017–18)

Season 37 (2018–19)

Season 38 (2018–19)

Season 39 (2018–19)

Season 40 (2018–19)

See also
List of Chopped: Canada episodes

References

External links
 Chopped episode guide at FoodNetwork.com
 Chopped Junior episode guide at FoodNetwork.com

Lists of food television series episodes